Nicolas Gersin (born 1765 – died December 1833 at Chantilly) was a French playwright and librettist.

An uncle of Jean-Louis-Auguste Loiseleur-Deslongchamps who studied in his home, his plays have been performed on the most important Parisian stages of the 19th century: Théâtre du Vaudeville, Théâtre de l'Odéon, Théâtre des Variétés-Amusantes, Théâtre-Français etc.

He died of apoplexy in December 1833 at Chantilly.

Works 

 Rosine ou l’Épouse abandonnée, opera in 3 acts, music by François-Joseph Gossec, 1786
 Hymne à l’Être suprême, 1794
 Arlequin-décorateur, comédie-parade in 1 act and in prose, mêlée de vaudevilles, with Alexandre de Ferrière, 1798
 Ne pas croire ce qu'on voit, comédie en vaudevilles in 1 act, 1798
 Gilles ventriloque, with Pierre-Ange Vieillard, 1799
 Le Triomphe de Camille, opéra in 1 act, with Vieillard, 1799
 Le Carrosse espagnol ou Pourquoi faire ?, comédie en vaudevilles in 1 act, with Étienne de Jouy, 1799
 Papirius ou Les Femmes comme elles étaient, parade historique in 1 act, mêlée de Vaudevilles, with Pierre-Ange Vieillard, 1801
 Les travestissements, comedy en 1 act, with Vieillard, 1805
 Un Tour de soubrette, comedy in 1 act and in prose, 1805
 Une heure de caprice, comedy in 1 act, mingled with vaudevilles, 1805
 Les Valets de campagne, comedy in 1 act, mingled with vaudevilles, 1805
 Les quatre Henri ou Le jugement du meunier de Lieursaint, parody without parody in 1 act mingled with vaudevilles, with Henri Simon, 1806
 Les filles de Mémoire ou Le mnémonite, comedy in 1 act, mingled with vaudevilles, with Michel Dieulafoy, 1807
 Le fond du sac ou La préface de Lina, parody vaudeville, in 1 act, with Dieulafoy, 1807
 Les pages du Duc de Vendôme, comedy in 1 act, mingled with vaudevilles, with Dieulafoy, 1807
 Au feu ou Les femmes solitaires, comédie en vaudevilles, in 1 act, with Dieulafoy, 1808
 La vallée de Barcelonnette ou Le Rendez-vous des deux ermites, comedy en vaudevilles in 1 act, with Dieulafoy, 1808
 Bayard au Pont-Neuf, ou le Picotin d'avoine, folie-vaudeville in 1 act, with Dieulafoy, 1808
 L'intrigue impromptue ou Il n'y a plus d'enfant, comédie en vaudevilles in 1 act, with Dieulafoy, 1809
 Adam Montauciel ou A qui la gloire ?, à-propos in 1 act and in vaudevilles, with Michel-Nicolas Balisson de Rougemont and Marc-Antoine Désaugiers, 1809
 L'auberge dans les nues ou le Chemin de la gloire, petite revue de quelques grandes pièces, in 1 act and in vaudevilles, with Dieulafoy and Henri Simon, 1810
 La manufacture d'indiennes ou Le triomphe du Schall et des queues du chat (parodie des bayadères), vaudeville in 1 act, with Dieulafoy, 1810
 La Robe et les bottes, ou Un effet d'optique, folie-vaudeville in 1 act, with Dieulafoy, 1810
 La Revanche grecque, ou Mahomet jugé par les femmes, tragicomico-vaudeville in 1 act, with Dieulafoy, 1811
 La Tasse de chocolat, ou Trop parler nuit, comédie en vaudevilles in 1 act, with Dieulafoy, 1811
 Jeanne d'Arc, ou le siège d'Orléans, historical comedy in 3 acts, mêlée de vaudevilles, with Dieulafoy, 1812
 Les Gardes-marine ou L'Amour et la faim, vaudeville in 1 act, with Dieulafoy, 1816
 Sans-Gêne chez lui, ou Chacun son tour, vaudeville in 1 act, with Dieulafoy, 1816
 Une visite à Charenton, folie-vaudeville in 1 act, with Pierre Carmouche, Eugène Durieu and Henri Simon, 1818
 Le Duel par la croisée, ou le Français à Milan, comédie en vaudevilles in 1 act, with Dieulafoy, 1818
 Brouette à vendre, comedy in 1 act, mêlée de vaudevilles, with Dieulafoy, 1818
 La Promesse de mariage, ou le Retour au hameau, opéra comique en 1 act and in prose, with Dieulafoy, 1818
 Le Drapeau français, ou les Soldats de Louis XIV, historical fact in 1 act, mingled with vaudevilles, with Henri Simon, 1819
 Un Dîner à Pantin, ou l'Amphytrion à la diète, tableau-vaudeville in 1 act, with Marc-Antoine Désaugiers and Michel-Joseph Gentil de Chavagnac, 1820
 La Leçon de danse et d'équitation, comedy in 1 act, mingled with couplets, with Sewrin, 1821
 Le Permesse gelé, ou les Glisseurs littéraires, folie-revue in 1 act, with Théaulon and Armand d'Artois, 1821
 La chercheuse d'esprit, opéra comique by Favart, mis en vaudevilles, with de Lurieu, 1822
 Les Arrangeuses, ou les Pièces mises en pièces, folie-vaudeville, in 1 act, with de Lurieu and Édouard-Joseph-Ennemond Mazères, 1822
 Le Chevalier d'honneur, comedy in 1 act, mingled with vaudevilles, with Sewrin and Léonard Tousez, 1823
 L'aveugle de Montmorency, comedy in 1 act mingled with couplets, with Nicolas Brazier, and Gabriel de Lurieu, 1823
 La Route de Bordeaux, à-propos in 1 act and in free verses, with Marc-Antoine Désaugiers and Michel-Joseph Gentil de Chavagnac, 1823
 La Couronne de fleurs, vaudeville in 1 act, with Gabriel de Lurieu et Jean-Baptiste-Charles Vial, 1825
 Le Château et la ferme, comedy in 1 act and in prose, with Emmanuel Théaulon et Paul Duport, 1825
 L'Appartement garni, ou les Deux locataires, comédie en vaudevilles in 1 act, with Pierre-Frédéric-Adolphe Carmouche and Mélesville, 1826
 Les Dames à la mode, à-propos-vaudeville in 1 act, with Brazier and de Lurieu, 1826
 Le Voisin, ou Faisons nos affaires nous-mêmes, comédie en vaudevilles in 1 act, with de Lurieu and Marc-Antoine Désaugiers, 1826

Bibliography 
 Pierre Marie Michel Lepeintre Desroches, Fin du Répertoire du Théâtre Français, 1824, p. 20
 Paul Ackermann, Dictionnaire biographique universel et pittoresque, vol.3, 1834, p. 18
 Mathieu Richard Auguste Henrion, Annuaire biographique, 1834, p. 417

Notes and references

External links 
 Nicolas Gersin on Data.bnf.fr

18th-century French dramatists and playwrights
19th-century French dramatists and playwrights
French opera librettists
1765 births
1833 deaths